Kim Kyung-Ho (Hangul: 김귱호) is a South Korean archer who won the 1997 World Archery Championships in Victoria, British Columbia.

References

South Korean male archers
Asian Games medalists in archery
Archers at the 1998 Asian Games
Archers at the 2002 Asian Games
Living people
Asian Games gold medalists for South Korea
Asian Games silver medalists for South Korea
World Archery Championships medalists
Medalists at the 1998 Asian Games
Medalists at the 2002 Asian Games
Year of birth missing (living people)
20th-century South Korean people
21st-century South Korean people